Agonostomus is a genus of fish in the family Mugilidae, the mullets.

These are considered to be the most primitive of the mullets. They are generally marine fish, though they spend much of their adult lives in freshwater. The two members of the genus occur in the Indian Ocean.

Species
There are currently two recognized species in this genus:
 Agonostomus catalai Pellegrin, 1932 – Comoro mullet
 Agonostomus telfairii E. T. Bennett, 1832 – fairy mullet

References 

 
Mugilidae